Josephine Elizabeth Tilden (March 24, 1869 – May 15, 1957) was an American expert on pacific algae. She was the first woman scientist employed by the University of Minnesota. Tilden established a research station in British Columbia which lasted only until 1906. When Tilden became an assistant Professor in 1903, she was the first female scientist employed by the University of Minnesota.  In 1910, despite not having a doctorate, Tilden was promoted to full professor.

Tilden traveled widely and particularly around the Pacific Ocean to collect unusual samples of flora. Tilden also created an important collection of algae which she took from the university and kept in her house for further study after she retired.

Life

Tilden was born in Davenport, Iowa, and grew up in Minneapolis. She showed an early interest in plants and she had published a paper on the local botany before she began her association with the University of Minnesota. In 1895, she earned a bachelor's degree followed by a masters the following year from the university. In 1897 she wrote a paper on algal stalactites, a phenomenon that she had discovered near a geyser in Yellowstone Park.

She became an instructor at her alma mater, where she took a peculiar interest in algology, becoming the first woman scientist on the staff. Her superiors at the university were concerned, but they agreed to fund this interest in return for her promise to commit to the subject for at least five years. In fact, Tilden gave a commitment that would last until she died. Her first trip to the Pacific was a journey to Vancouver Island. On many of these journeys she was accompanied by her mother.

Tilden was the leading force of the establishment of the Minnesota Seaside Station in Canada. In 1900, traveling by canoe, she discovered a largely uninhabited stretch of coastline in British Columbia with an abundance of algae and tidal pools. The land owner gave her the area for free, and she chose four acres that were ideal to create an algae research station. The area was known as Botanical Beach in what is now Juan de Fuca Provincial Park in British Columbia. Tilden used her own funds to build the research station. In 1902 Conway MacMillan published a long description of the new station claiming a benefit of its location was students had to take an important journey across North America to get there.

Up to 30 professors and students journeyed to the station by train every summer to study geology, algology, zoology, taxonomy, and lichenology, with world-renowned scientists participating in the lecture series. Though students worked long hours, they also worked hard at enjoying themselves with hiking trips, evening plays and storytelling—transforming the group of scholars into close-knit colleagues. Letters from student Alice Misz to her mother during the summer of 1906 make it clear that her six-week stay at the station was the most unforgettable experience of her life.

After purchase, Tilden in turn offered this land and the buildings that were on it to the University of Minnesota. Despite the entreaties of Professor Conway MacMillan and Tilden, the university refused to take responsibility for land in a different country. MacMillan resigned over this issue. Although the station was shut down in 1907, Tilden's enthusiasm was not dampened, and she went on to lead research expeditions to the South Pacific, and continued collecting and writing long after her retirement. The Minnesota Seaside Station was replaced by the more local Lake Itasca Forestry and Biological Station in northern Minnesota in 1909. The following year, and despite not having a doctorate, Tilden was made a full professor of the University of Minnesota.

She also published the Algae of Minnesota in 1910 which covered "The Myxophyceae of North America and adjacent regions including Central America, Greenland, Bermuda, the West Indies and Hawaii". An academic review of her book by George Francis Atkinson noted that the work was gathered together in one place, but it welcomed a second volume that might make a "thorough and critical study of this material, comparing it with type material" then it will be a "valuable contribution to American Algology".

Tilden traveled widely especially around the Pacific Ocean to gather dried plants. During 1909 and 1910 Tilden undertook a trip to the South Pacific accompanied by a fellow Professor of Botany Ethel Winifred B. Chase and a botanist friend of Ethel's, Bernice Leland. The women amassed a scientifically significant collection of botanical specimens during their trip.  Later Tilden went on to organize a trip around the world for ten students whose sole purpose was to gather algae and other samples. Tilden charged the students to accompany her and even obtained loans and grants to fund the travel. The trip caused Tilden to gain a reputation for a lack of integrity. She never obtained formal permission for the trip and although she directed unbudgeted items to the university, one of the loans she undertook was never repaid. It is said that on her return she was asked "to retire".

She retired in 1937 having gathered an important collection of algae. The Chair of the department, Professor Rosenthal, who had a vendetta running with Tilden, made sure that she could not borrow any samples from the university's herbarium. But Tilden outwitted him. She appealed to the university's board who granted her request that she should be allowed to take her collection with her. The collection was installed on one floor of her new home in Florida and she used this to publish further research.

In 1935, she published The Algae and Their Life Relations, which was the first scientific work by an American scientist to describe the characteristics of marine and freshwater flora.

Tilden died in Florida in 1957. After her death, the University of Minnesota's Botany Department acquired many of the algae specimens she had been keeping in her Florida home by collaborating with Joseph Wachter, whom she had given the rights to in her will. A complete set of South Pacific Plants exsiccatae collected by Tilden and 10 University of Minnesota students is held at the University of Melbourne Herbarium. Further specimens are held in Australasian herbaria including the National Herbarium of Victoria at the Royal Botanic Gardens Victoria, the Australian National Herbarium and the Auckland War Memorial Museum Herbarium.

Selected publications 
Selected books and articles include:

 Minnesota Algae: The Myxophyceae of North America and Adjacent Regions Including Central America, Greenland, Bermuda, The West Indies, and Hawai,i (2010). Board of Regents of the University For The People of Minnesota, Minneapolis. 
Observations on Some West American Thermal Algae, (1898). Botanical Gazette. 
Basicladia, a New Genus of Cladophoraceae, (1930). Botanical Gazette. 
Some New Species of Minnesota Algae Which Live In a Calcareous or Siliceous Matrix, (1897). Botanical Gazette.    
A Classification of the Algae Based on Evolutionary Development, with Special Reference to Pigmentation, (1933). Botanical Gazette.

Legacy
Tildenia is a genus of moths in the family Gelechiidae that was named by C.C. Kossinskaja in 1926 to honor Tilden. Her collection of plants was left to a friend but he offered it to Minnesota University. There is a small museum about her. One of her biographers summarized his account with the title "Algae of Acrimony".

References

External links

1869 births
1957 deaths
People from Davenport, Iowa
Scientists from Minneapolis
American women scientists
University of Minnesota alumni
University of Minnesota faculty
Women phycologists
American phycologists
American women academics